Thysaniezia is a genus of flatworms belonging to the family Taeniidae.

Species:

Thysaniezia aspinosa 
Thysaniezia himalayai 
Thysaniezia ovilla

References

Cestoda